The Delaware Federals were a professional ice hockey team that played in the Federal Hockey League. Despite representing Delaware, the team did not have a home arena for games or practices. They were owned by Delaware Pro Hockey International, their head coach was Dan Farrell. They replaced the folded Vermont Wild on the league schedule and played their first competitive game on December 16, 2011, which ended with an 18–0 loss to the Cape Cod Bluefins.

The league would reuse the Federals' name to finish the 2017–18 season for the Northern Federals in games against the Watertown Wolves.

Season-by-season record
Federal Hockey League

References

Federal Prospects Hockey League teams
Ice hockey teams in Delaware